Alesua is a monotypic moth genus in the family Erebidae. Its only species, Alesua etialis, is known from Mexico. Both the genus and species were first described by Harrison Gray Dyar Jr. in 1918.

References

Rivulinae
Monotypic moth genera